Kerlly Lizeth Real Carranza (born 7 November 1998) is an Ecuadorian professional footballer who plays as a midfielder for Spanish Primera División club Valencia CF and the Ecuador women's national team.

She was part of the Ecuadorian squad for the 2015 FIFA Women's World Cup.

References

External links
 
 
 

1998 births
Living people
Footballers from Quito
Women's association football midfielders
Ecuadorian women's footballers
Ecuador women's international footballers
2015 FIFA Women's World Cup players
Pan American Games competitors for Ecuador
Footballers at the 2015 Pan American Games
Málaga CF Femenino players
Segunda Federación (women) players
Córdoba CF players
Ecuadorian expatriate footballers
Ecuadorian expatriate sportspeople in Spain
Expatriate women's footballers in Spain
21st-century Ecuadorian women